Timothy James O'Keefe (or O'Keeffe) (1910 – 1943) was a Republic of Ireland international footballer. Born in Cork O'Keefe began his career with Cork F.C. in 1930 before moving to Waterford in 1936. During his time with Waterford he became an integral part of the team that won the FAI Cup in 1937, scoring in every round, including the winning goal in the final against St James's Gate.

O'Keefe was capped three times for the Republic of Ireland at senior level. His debut was in a 4–4 home draw with Belgium in 1934. He also won caps against Czechoslovakia and Poland in 1938.

O'Keefe died at age 33 in the Bon Secours hospital in Cork; his death was caused by cancer.

References

External links
 Profile from soccerscene.ie
 Profile from Waterford United FC website

Republic of Ireland association footballers
Republic of Ireland international footballers
Hibernian F.C. players
Cork F.C. players
Waterford F.C. players
Scottish Football League players
1910 births
Year of death missing
Association football forwards